The Kamburu Hydroelectric Power Station, also Kamburu Dam is a rock-filled embankment dam on the Tana River in Kenya. It straddles the border of Embu and Machakos Counties in Eastern Province. The primary purpose of the dam is hydroelectric power generation and it supports a 93 MW power station. Construction on the dam began in 1971 and it was completed in 1975. The power station was commissioned the same year. US$23 million of the US$47 million project cost was provided by the World Bank. The power station is operated by Kenya Electricity Generating Company and is part of the Seven Forks Scheme.

The power station is located underground just below the left toe and contains three 31 MW Francis turbine-generators.

See also

 Masinga Dam – upstream
 Gitaru Dam – downstream
 List of power stations in Kenya
 List of hydropower stations in Africa

References

Energy infrastructure completed in 1974
Hydroelectric power stations in Kenya
Dams on the Tana River (Kenya)
Dams in Kenya
Dams completed in 1974
Underground power stations
Machakos County
Embu County
Rock-filled dams